The Yardbirds are an English rock band, formed in London in 1963. The band's core lineup featured vocalist and harmonica player Keith Relf, drummer Jim McCarty, rhythm guitarist and later bassist Chris Dreja, and bassist/producer Paul Samwell-Smith. The band started the careers of three of rock's most famous guitarists: Eric Clapton, Jeff Beck and Jimmy Page, all of whom ranked in the top five of Rolling Stone magazine's list of 100 greatest guitarists. The band had a string of hits throughout the mid-1960s, including "For Your Love", "Heart Full of Soul", "Shapes of Things", and "Over Under Sideways Down".

Originally a blues-based band noted for their signature "rave-up" instrumental breaks, the Yardbirds broadened their range into pop, pioneering psychedelic rock and early hard rock; and contributed to many electric guitar innovations of the mid-1960s. Some rock critics and historians also cite their influence on the later punk rock, progressive rock, and heavy metal trends. Following the band's split in 1968, Relf and McCarty formed Renaissance and guitarist Jimmy Page formed Led Zeppelin – the latter of which was initially intended as a direct successor to the Yardbirds. The Yardbirds re-formed in the 1990s, featuring McCarty and Dreja as the only original members. Dreja left the band in 2012, leaving McCarty as the sole original member of the band in the present lineup.

The band was inducted into the Rock and Roll Hall of Fame in 1992. They were included at number 89 in Rolling Stone list of the "100 Greatest Artists of All Time" and ranked number 37 on VH1's 100 Greatest Artists of Hard Rock.

History

Beginnings and Clapton line-up (1963–1965)
The band formed in the south-west London suburbs in 1963. Relf and Samwell-Smith were originally in a band named the Metropolitan Blues Quartet. After being joined by Dreja, McCarty, and Top Topham, they performed at Kingston Art School in late May 1963 as a backup band for Cyril Davies. Following a couple of gigs in September 1963 as the Blue-Sounds, they changed their name to the Yardbirds. McCarty claims that Relf was the first to use the name; he may have gotten it from Jack Kerouac's novel On the Road, where it referred to rail yard hobos. He adds that Topham identified it as a nickname for jazz saxophonist Charlie "Yardbird" Parker.

The quintet achieved notice on the burgeoning British rhythm and blues scene when they took over as the house band at the Crawdaddy Club in Richmond, succeeding the Rolling Stones. Their repertoire drew from the Chicago blues of Howlin' Wolf, Muddy Waters, Bo Diddley, Sonny Boy Williamson II, and Elmore James, including "Smokestack Lightning", "Good Morning Little School Girl", "Boom Boom", "I Wish You Would", "Rollin' and Tumblin'", "Got Love if You Want It", and "I'm a Man".

Original lead guitarist Topham left and was replaced by Eric Clapton in October 1963. Crawdaddy Club impresario Giorgio Gomelsky became their manager and first record producer. Under Gomelsky's guidance the Yardbirds toured Britain as the back-up band for blues legend Sonny Boy Williamson II in December 1963 and early 1964, recording live tracks on 8 December and other dates. The recordings would be released two years later during the height of Yardbird popularity on the album Sonny Boy Williamson and the Yardbirds.

After the tours with Williamson, the Yardbirds signed to EMI's Columbia label in February 1964, and recorded more live tracks on 20 March at the legendary Marquee Club in London. The resulting album of mostly American blues and R&B covers, Five Live Yardbirds, was released by Columbia nine months later, and it failed to enter the UK Albums Chart. Over time, Five Live gained stature as one of the few high-quality live recordings of the era and as an historical document of both the British rock and roll boom of the 1960s and Clapton's time in the band. 

The Clapton line-up recorded two singles, the blues "I Wish You Would" and "Good Morning, School Girl", before the band scored its first major hit with "For Your Love", a Graham Gouldman composition with a prominent harpsichord part by Brian Auger. "For Your Love" hit the top of the charts in the United Kingdom and Canada and reached number six in the United States, but it displeased Clapton, a blues purist whose vision extended beyond three-minute singles. Frustrated by the commercial approach, he abruptly left the band on 25 March 1965, the day the single was released. Soon Clapton joined John Mayall & the Bluesbreakers, but not before he recommended Jimmy Page, a prominent young session guitarist, to replace him. Content with his lucrative sessions work, and worried about both his health and the politics of Clapton's departure, Page in turn recommended his friend Jeff Beck. Beck played his first gig with the Yardbirds only two days after Clapton's departure.

Beck line-up (1965–1966) 

Beck's exploration of fuzz tone, reverb, feedback, sustain, distortion, and hammer-on soloing fit well into the increasingly raw style of British beat music. The Yardbirds began to experiment with eclectic arrangements reminiscent of Gregorian chants and various European and Asian styles while Beck infused a pervasive Middle Eastern influence into the mix. Beck was voted No. 1 lead guitarist of 1966 in the British music magazine Beat Instrumental.

The Beck-era Yardbirds produced many groundbreaking recordings, including the hit singles "Heart Full of Soul", "Evil Hearted You"/"Still I'm Sad", a cover of Bo Diddley's "I'm a Man" (US only), "Shapes of Things", and "Over Under Sideways Down", and the Yardbirds album (known popularly as Roger the Engineer).

Beck's fuzz-tone guitar riff on "Heart Full of Soul" helped to introduce Indian-influenced guitar stylings to the UK Singles Chart in the summer of 1965. The follow-up, the reverb-laden "Evil Hearted You", furthered the Eastern influence, while its B-side, "Still I'm Sad", featured the band chanting like Gregorian monks. The Diddley cover, "I'm a Man", was hard blues rock, featured the Yardbirds' signature "rave-up", where the tempo shifted to double time and Relf's harmonica and Beck's scratching guitar raced to a climax before falling back into the original beat.

The band embarked on their first US tour in late August 1965. A pair of albums were put together for the US market: For Your Love and Having a Rave Up, half of which came from the earlier Five Live Yardbirds album, combined with new tracks such as "You're a Better Man Than I" and "Train Kept A-Rollin'", both recorded with legendary producer Sam Phillips at Sun Studios in Memphis, Tennessee, during the first US tour. There were three more United States tours during Beck's time with the band and a brief European tour in April 1966.

The single "Shapes of Things", released in February 1966, "can justifiably be classified as the first psychedelic rock classic," according to music journalist Richie Unterberger and heralded the coming of British psychedelia three months before the Beatles' "Paperback Writer"/"Rain". Reaching number three on the UK charts and 11 in the US, "Shapes" was also the Yardbirds' first self-penned hit, the previous three UK A-sides having been written by Gouldman. Relf's vague anti-war protest lyrics and Beck's feedback-driven, Middle Eastern-influenced solo reflected the band's increasing embrace of psychedelia, as did the B-side "You're A Better Man Than I" and the follow-up single, "Over Under Sideways Down". The latter was released in May and features more quixotic lyrics by Relf and another Eastern-inspired guitar line by Beck.

The "Over Under Sideways Down" sessions were held in April 1966 and produced the album Yardbirds. It was commonly referred to as "Roger the Engineer", which were the words scrawled under a cartoon by Dreja of engineer Roger Cameron that appears on the cover of the UK release. In the US, an abridged version of the album, minus the cartoon cover art, was released as Over Under Sideways Down. The recording session marked the Yardbirds' split with their manager, Giorgio Gomelsky, as writer Simon Napier-Bell took over management and shared production credit with Samwell-Smith.

The band, led by Relf and McCarty, eschewed cover material, writing the entire album themselves. They were allotted "a whole week" to record the album, according to Dreja, resulting in a "crammed" albeit an eclectic mix of blues, hard rock, monkish chanting ("Turn into Earth", "Ever Since the World Began") and African tribal rhythms ("Hot House of Omagararshid"). Beck's guitar lines were a unifying constant throughout. Roger the Engineer was ranked at number 350 on Rolling Stone magazine's "500 Greatest Albums of All Time".

Beck/Page line-up (1966) 

Roger the Engineer was released in June 1966. Soon afterward, Samwell-Smith quit the band at a drunken gig at Queen's College in Oxford and embarked on a career as a record producer. Jimmy Page, who was at the show, agreed that night to play bass until rhythm guitarist Dreja could rehearse on the instrument. The band toured with Page on bass, and Beck and Dreja on guitars, playing dates in Paris, the United Kingdom, the Midwestern United States, and the California coast. Beck fell ill late in the latter tour and was hospitalised in San Francisco. Page took over as lead guitarist at the Carousel Ballroom (San Francisco) on 25 August and Dreja switched to bass. Beck stayed in San Francisco to recuperate with his girlfriend Mary Hughes, while the rest of the band completed the tour. After the Yardbirds reunited in London, Dreja remained on bass and the group's dual lead guitar attack was born.

The Beck/Page lead guitar partnership created the avant-garde psychedelic rock single "Happenings Ten Years Time Ago" (with future Led Zeppelin bassist John Paul Jones on bass instead of Dreja), which the band recorded in July and September 1966. The single's UK B-side was "Psycho Daisies", two minutes of garage punk sludge featuring Beck on vocals and lead guitar, and Page on bass. The single's B-side in the US, "The Nazz Are Blue", also features a rare lead vocal by Beck.

The Yardbirds also recorded "Stroll On", a reworking of Tiny Bradshaw's "Train Kept A-Rollin'", recorded for Michelangelo Antonioni's critically acclaimed film Blow-Up. Relf changed the song's lyrics and title to avoid having to seek permission from the copyright holder. Their appearance in the film, about a hip fashion photographer (played by David Hemmings) undergoing an existential crisis in Swinging London, came after the Who declined and the In-Crowd were unable to attend the filming. Andy Warhol's "Factory" band The Velvet Underground was also considered for the part but was unable to acquire UK work permits. Director Antonioni instructed Beck to smash his guitar in emulation of the Who's Pete Townshend. The guitar that Beck destroys in the film was a cheap Höfner instrument.

The Beck/Page line-up recorded little else in the studio. No live recordings of the dual-lead guitar lineup have surfaced, except for "Great Shakes", a commercial recorded for Great Shakes milkshakes using the opening riff of "Over Under Sideways Down", included on the 1992 Little Games Sessions & More compilation.

One recording made by Beck and Page in May 1966, just weeks before Page joined the Yardbirds, was "Beck's Bolero". This piece was inspired by Ravel's "Bolero" and credited to Page (although Beck also claims to have written the song), with John Paul Jones on bass, Keith Moon on drums and Nicky Hopkins on piano. Around the time of this session, the idea of a "supergroup" involving Beck, Page, Moon, and Who bassist John Entwistle originated, with Entwistle suggesting it would "go over like a lead balloon" and Moon quipping that they could call the band "Lead Zeppelin". Although all the musicians remained with their respective bands, Page recalled the conversation in 1968 when deciding on the name for Led Zeppelin. "Beck's Bolero" was first released in 1967 as the B-side of Beck's first solo single, "Hi Ho Silver Lining", and was included the following year on The Jeff Beck Group's debut album, Truth.

The Yardbirds opened for the Rolling Stones' 1966 UK tour (with Ike & Tina Turner, Peter Jay and Long John Baldry also on the bill), released the "Happenings" single, shot their scenes in Blow-Up, and then headed back to the US for a show at the Fillmore Auditorium in San Francisco, and a slot on American Bandstand host Dick Clark's "Caravan of Stars" tour, which they joined in Texas. After a few shows with the Caravan, Beck stormed out and headed back to San Francisco and Mary Hughes. The band, still in Texas, continued on the Dick Clark tour as a quartet, with Page as the sole lead guitarist. They caught up with Beck in late November, at which point Beck officially left the band. Beck's lack of professionalism, his temper, Relf's drunkenness, the gruelling and unrewarding Dick Clark Caravan, and other pressures were cited, none of which involved Beck being fired. Beck's official departure was announced on 30 November in the US. The Yardbirds finished their remaining US dates with Page as sole lead guitarist and headed back to the UK for more shows scheduled by Napier-Bell. Beck continued as a solo artist.

Page line-up and split (1966–1968)

Page subsequently introduced playing the instrument with a cello bow (suggested to him by violinist David McCallum Sr.) and the combination of a wah-wah pedal in addition to a distortion fuzzbox. Other innovations included the use of a taped noise loop in live settings (on the psychedelic dirge "Glimpses") and open-tuned guitar to enhance the sitar-like sounds the Yardbirds were known for.

Meanwhile, the act's commercial fortunes were declining. "Happenings Ten Years Time Ago" had only reached No. 30 on the US Hot 100 and had fared worse in the U.K. The band dropped Napier-Bell and entered into a partnership with Columbia Records hit-making producer, Mickie Most, known for his work with the Animals, Herman's Hermits and Scottish singer Donovan, yet this move failed to reignite their chart success. Most was hired by the Yardbirds' label to broaden their pop appeal and rectify their waning chart performance; however, the band's change in sound under his direction was poorly received. After the disappointing sales of "Happenings", the single "Little Games" released in March 1967 flopped so badly in the UK (where it was backed by "Puzzles") that EMI did not release another Yardbirds record there until after the band broke up. A 1968 UK release of the "Goodnight Sweet Josephine" single was planned but cancelled. A version of Tony Hazzard's "Ha Ha Said the Clown"on which only Relf performedbacked by the Relf–McCarty original "Tinker Tailor, Soldier Sailor", was the band's last single to enter the US top 50, peaking at No. 44 on the Billboard chart in the summer of 1967.

Epic compiled the six earlier A-side hits and B-sides ("New York City Blues", "Still I'm Sad") with the heaviest material from For Your Love ("I'm Not Talking") and Having a Rave Up ("Smokestack Lightning"), and released The Yardbirds Greatest Hits in the US in March 1967. The album featured the first appearance of "Happenings" and "Shapes of Things" on an album. Although it omitted "Psycho Daisies", which had only been released in the UK as a B-side, Greatest Hits described to the Yardbirds' growing American audience an almost complete picture of "what made the Yardbirds a great band", according to AllMusic critic Bruce Eder. In the description of author Greg Russo, the compilation also presented young garage rock musicians of the psychedelic era with a handy textbook of the band's work during 1965–66. Greatest Hits was the Yardbirds' best-selling US album release, peaking at No. 28 on the Billboard chart.

The band spent the first half of 1967 touring Australia, New Zealand, Denmark, and France (including a stop in Cannes to help promote Blow-Up). They also played a handful of shows in the United Kingdom in June, before heading to Vancouver to begin their fourth tour of North America with Page.

Their final album, Little Games, was released in July 1967, again only in the US. It was a commercial and critical non-entity. A cover of Harry Nilsson's "Ten Little Indians" charted briefly in the US.

The Yardbirds spent much of the rest of that year touring in the US with a new manager Peter Grant, their live shows becoming heavier and more experimental. The band rarely played their 1967 Mickie Most-produced singles on stage, preferring to mix the Beck-era hits with blues standards and experimental psychedelia, such as "Glimpses", a Page-written piece from Little Games featuring bowed guitars, pre-recorded noise loops, and a hypnotic wah-wah guitar groove. They also covered the Velvet Underground ("I'm Waiting for the Man") and Bob Dylan ("Most Likely You Go Your Way And I'll Go Mine") and American folk singer Jake Holmes, whose "Dazed and Confused", with overhauled arrangement by Page and lyrics modified by Relf, was shaped in fall of 1967 and a live fixture of the final American tour in 1968. "Dazed and Confused" went down so well that Page selected it for the first Led Zeppelin record, on which it appears with further revised lyrics and Page credited as the writer. (Page and Holmes would settle on an "Inspired by" credit for Holmes in 2011).

By 1968, the psychedelic blues rock of Cream and the Jimi Hendrix Experience was enormously popular, yet Relf and McCarty wished to pursue a style influenced by folk and classical music. Page wanted to continue with the kind of "heavy" music for which Led Zeppelin would become iconic. Dreja was developing an interest in photography. By March, Relf and McCarty had decided to leave but were persuaded by the other two to stay at least for one more American tour.

The band's final single was recorded in January and released two months later.  Reflecting the divergences of the band members and their producer, the A-side, "Goodnight Sweet Josephine", was another Mickie Most-produced pop single, while the B-side, "Think About It", featured a proto-Zeppelin Page riff and snippets of the "Dazed and Confused" guitar solo. It failed to chart on the Billboard Hot 100.

A concert and some album tracks were recorded in New York City in March and early April (including the unreleased song "Knowing That I'm Losing You", an early version of a track that would be re-recorded by Led Zeppelin as "Tangerine"). All were shelved at the band's request, but after Led Zeppelin became successful Epic tried to release the concert material as Live Yardbirds: Featuring Jimmy Page. The album was quickly withdrawn after Page's lawyers filed an injunction.

The Yardbirds played their final shows on 31 May and 1 June at the Shrine Auditorium in Los Angeles, and on 4 and 5 June at the Spring Fair at the Montgomery International Speedway in Alabama. The Los Angeles shows were documented in the bootleg release Last Rave-Up in L.A. The Yardbirds announced the departure of Relf and McCarty in a press release on 12 June ("Two Yardbirds Fly") and returned home to play one last show, on 7 July 1968, at the College of Technology in Luton, Bedfordshire, supported by the Linton Grae Sound.  Rolling Stone magazine announced the break-up by saying that Page "intends to go into solo recording work".

The Yardbirds, The New Yardbirds and Led Zeppelin  

Page and Dreja, with a tour of Scandinavia scheduled for late summer 1968, saw the break-up as an opportunity to put a new lineup together with Page as producer and Grant as manager. Page initially described his vision for the new band as "a new sort of collage of sound" that would include mellotron keyboard while still featuring the guitar. Procol Harum's B.J. Wilson, Paul Francis, and session man Clem Cattini, who had guested on more than a few Yardbirds tracks under Most's supervision, were considered drummers. Young vocalist and composer Terry Reid was asked to replace Relf but declined because of a new recording contract with Most and recommended the then-unknown Robert Plant. Plant, in turn, recommended his childhood friend John Bonham as a drummer. Dreja bowed out to pursue a career as a rock photographer. Bassist/keyboardist/arranger John Paul Joneswho had worked with Page on countless sessions, including several with the Yardbirdsapproached Page and offered his services. Rehearsals began in mid-August 1968; in early September, Page's revised Yardbirds embarked as the New Yardbirds on the Scandinavian tour, after which the band returned to the UK to produce the debut Led Zeppelin album.

While Page's new roster still played a few songs from the Yardbirds' canonusually "Train Kept a-Rollin'", "Dazed and Confused" or "For Your Love" and snatches of Beck's "Shapes of Things" soloa name (and identity) change was in order in October 1968. They appeared on contracts, promotional material, ticket stubs and other collateral as "The Yardbirds" or "The New Yardbirds" for three shows in October 1968, with the Marquee Club date reported as the Yardbirds' "farewell London appearance" and the Liverpool University show 19 Oct announced as the Yardbirds' "last ever appearance". This may have been motivated, at least in part, by a cease-and-desist order from Dreja, who claimed that he maintained legal rights to "The Yardbirds" name, although most sources indicate that Page and Grant fully intended to change the name after they returned from Scandinavia with or without the nudge from Dreja. From 19 October 1968 onwards, they were Led Zeppelin, the name taken from The Who bandmembers Moon and Entwistle's "lead balloon" discussion of the "supergroup" that had played on the "Beck's Bolero" sessions in May 1966. The spelling of "lead" was changed to avoid confusion over the pronunciation. This effectively marked the end of the Yardbirds for the next 24 years.

After the Yardbirds  

Relf and McCarty formed an acoustic rock band called Together and then Renaissance, which recorded two albums for Island Records over two years. McCarty formed the band Shoot in 1973. Relf, after producing albums for Medicine Head (with whom he also played bass) and Saturnalia, resurfaced in 1975 with a new quartet, Armageddon; a hybrid of heavy metal, hard rock and folk influences, which now included former Renaissance bandmate Louis Cennamo, drummer Bobby Caldwell (previously a member of Captain Beyond and Johnny Winter), and guitarist Martin Pugh (from Steamhammer, Rod Stewart's An Old Raincoat Won't Ever Let You Down, and most recently in 7th Order). They recorded one promising album before Relf died in an electrical accident in his home studio on 12 May 1976. In 1977, Illusion was formed, featuring a reunited lineup of the original Renaissance, including McCarty and Keith's sister Jane Relf.

In the 1980s McCarty, Dreja, and Samwell-Smith formed a short-lived Yardbirds semi-reunion called Box of Frogs, which occasionally included Beck and Page plus various friends with whom they had all recorded over the years. They recorded two albums for Epic, the self-titled "Box of Frogs" (1984) and "Strange Land" (1986). McCarty was also part of 'The British Invasion All-Stars' with members of Procol Harum, The Creation, the Nashville Teens, the Downliners Sect and The Pretty Things. Phil May and Dick Taylor of the Pretty Things, together with McCarty, recorded two albums in Chicago as the Pretty ThingsYardbirds Blues BandThe Chicago Blues Tapes 1991 and Wine, Women, Whiskey, both produced by George Paulus.

The Yardbirds were inducted into the Rock and Roll Hall of Fame in 1992. Nearly all the surviving musicians who had been part of the band's heyday, including Jeff Beck and Jimmy Page, appeared at the ceremony. (Original lead guitarist Top Topham was not included.) Eric Clapton, whose Hall of Fame induction was the first of three, was unable to attend because of his obligations while recording and working on a show for the MTV Unplugged series. Accepting the induction on behalf of the late Keith Relf were his wife April and son Danny.

Reformation  

In 1992, Peter Barton from Rock Artist Management contacted Jim McCarty about the prospect of reforming the Yardbirds. McCarty was interested but only if Chris Dreja would agree, but at the time he thought it highly unlikely that Dreja would want to tour again. Barton then contacted Dreja, who agreed to give it a try. Their debut gig was booked at the Marquee Club in London along with the newly reformed Animals. It was a great success. The lineup featured John Idan handling bass and lead vocals. Barton managed the band and booked all their dates for over a decade; he still works with the band on occasion.

In 2003, a new album, Birdland, was released under the Yardbirds name on the Favored Nations label by a lineup including Chris Dreja, Jim McCarty, and new members Gypie Mayo (lead guitar, backing vocals), John Idan (bass, lead vocals) and Alan Glen (harmonica, backing vocals), which consisted of a mixture of new material mostly penned by McCarty and re-recordings of some of their greatest hits, with guest appearances by Joe Satriani, Steve Vai, Slash, Brian May, Steve Lukather, Jeff "Skunk" Baxter, John Rzeznik, Martin Ditchum and Simon McCarty. Also, Jeff Beck reunited with his former bandmates on the song "My Blind Life". And then there was the rare and improbable guest appearance on stage in 2005 by their first guitarist from the 1960s, Top Topham.

After the release of Birdland, Mayo was replaced briefly by Jerry Donahue, and subsequently in 2005 by the then 20-year-old guitarist Ben King, while Glen was replaced by Billy Boy Miskimmin from Nine Below Zero fame. In 2007 the Yardbirds released a live CD, recorded on 19 July 2006, entitled Live at B.B. King Blues Club (Favored Nations), featuring the McCarty, Dreja, Idan, King, and Miskimmin line-up. The first episode of the 2007/08 season for The Simpsons featured the Yardbirds' "I'm A Man" from the CD Live at B.B. King Blues Club (Favored Nations).

According to his website, Idan resigned from the Yardbirds in August 2008, although his last gig with them was on Friday 24 April 2009, when they headlined the first concert in the new Live Room venue at Twickenham rugby stadium. This was also Glen's last gig with the band after temporarily standing in when Miskimmin was unavailable. Idan and Glen were replaced by Andy Mitchell (lead vocals, harmonica, acoustic guitar) and David Smale (bass, backing vocals), brother of the virtuoso guitarist Jonathan Smale. Dreja sat out the US spring 2012 tour to recover from an illness. It was announced in 2013 that he was leaving the band for medical reasons and would be replaced by original Yardbirds guitarist Topham.

McCarty announced in December 2014 that the current lineup of the Yardbirds had disbanded. He told fans in an email that he would be "working on solo ventures and other Yardbirds projects in 2015.” However, the Yardbirds continued to tour in 2015. In May 2015 Topham left the band and was replaced by Earl Slick, though Slick never played a gig with the band.

In August 2015, it was announced they would play the Eel Pie Club in Twickenham, west London on 17 October with a line-up of Jim McCarty, John Idan, Ben King, David Smale, and Billyboy Miskimmin. On 12 August 2015, it was announced that Boston-based guitarist Johnny A. would become the newest member of the Yardbirds for their North American tour running from 30 October to 22 November 2015.  Johnny A. continued to tour as the Yardbirds' lead guitarist throughout 2016, 2017, and 2018 performing a total of 110 shows before departing.  Johnny A.'s last show with The Yardbirds was on 23 June 2018 at The Egyptian Theater, Park City, Utah. Former Ram Jam harmonica player Myke Scavone joined the band at the end of 2015. On 15 April 2016, the band played at the Under the Bridge venue in London with a line-up of Jim McCarty, John Idan, Johnny A, Kenny Aaronson, and Billyboy Miskimmin.

Godfrey Townsend replaced Johnny A. in July 2018. Townsend had previously toured with John Entwistle, Alan Parsons and as musical director the previous ten years with the Happy Together tours.

Musical style  

Along with John Mayall's Bluesbreakers, The Yardbirds were part of the British blues scene of the 1960s. As the blues rock genre developed, some acts like Chicken Shack were playing a louder and more aggressive style, while the Yardbirds emphasized instrumental textures and extended instrumental improvisations. They covered blues classics like Howlin' Wolf's Smokestack Lightning (1956) and Bo Diddley's 1955 I'm a Man which had a repetitive structure where instrumental solos were brief breaks between repetition of verses. The Yardbirds often extended these instrumental sections into "heavy jams".

Members 

Current members
 Jim McCarty – drums, percussion, backing vocals (1963–1968, 1992–present)
 John Idan – lead vocals (1995–2009, 2015–present), lead guitar (1992–1994), bass (1994–2009), rhythm guitar (2015–present)
 Kenny Aaronson – bass (2015–present)
 Myke Scavone – harmonica, percussion, backing vocals (2015–present)
 Godfrey Townsend – lead guitar, backing vocals (2018–present)

Discography

Five Live Yardbirds (1964)
For Your Love (1965)
Having a Rave Up with The Yardbirds (1965)
Roger the Engineer (1966)
Little Games (1967)
Birdland (2003)

See also 
Freakbeat
Swinging London

References
Citations

Sources

External links

 

 
British Invasion artists
British rhythm and blues boom musicians
Charly Records artists
Columbia Graphophone Company artists
English blues rock musical groups
Eric Clapton
Musical groups established in 1963
Musical groups from London
English psychedelic rock music groups
Musical groups disestablished in 1968
Musical groups reestablished in 1992
Jimmy Page
Musical quintets